Dionisio Quintana Viltres (born October 9, 1957) is a retired male javelin thrower from Cuba, who competed for his native country during the 1970s and the 1980s. He later became the trainer of Osleidys Menéndez.

Achievements

References

 1981 Year Ranking

1957 births
Living people
Cuban male javelin throwers
Competitors at the 1982 Central American and Caribbean Games
Central American and Caribbean Games gold medalists for Cuba
Place of birth missing (living people)
Central American and Caribbean Games medalists in athletics